Mircea Sântimbreanu (January 7, 1926 – August 19, 1999) was a Romanian writer, journalist, screenwriter and film producer. Sântimbreanu was the director of the publishing house Albatros,  and is best remembered as a writer of children's literature. The literary magazine Observator Cultural listed  Sântimbreanu as one of the leading writers of children's literature in Romania, among others such as Dumitru Almaș, Călin Gruia, Gica Iuteș, Octav Pancu-Iași, and Ovidiu Zotta.

Selected works
 Cu și fără ghiozdan (1956), 
 Extemporale și... alte lucrări scrise (1963),
 Lângă groapa cu furnici (1964),
 Recreația mare (1965), reeditare Editura Herra, 2009
 32 de premianți (1980)
 Să stăm de vorbă fără catalog (1980)
 Mama mamuților mahmuri (1980) 
 Pescuitul de la A la Z – ghidul pescarului sportiv, Editura Venus, 1995
 Să stăm de vorbă fără catalog, Editura Herra, 2009

References

Romanian male writers
Romanian journalists
Romanian screenwriters
1926 births
1999 deaths
Romanian children's writers
Male screenwriters
20th-century screenwriters
20th-century journalists